Ritu Kumari Phogat (born 2 May 1994) is an Indian mixed martial artist who competed in the Atomweight division of ONE Championship. She is also a female wrestler who won a gold medal at the 2016 Commonwealth Wrestling Championship.

Early and personal life

Ritu is the third daughter of former wrestler Mahavir Singh Phogat and started training under her father at the age of eight. 

Her sisters Geeta Phogat and Babita Kumari as well as cousin Vinesh Phogat are all Commonwealth Games gold medalists in wrestling. Another cousin of her, Priyanka Phogat, is also an international level wrestler.

Wrestling career
In October 2016, Phogat won her second consecutive title at the annual National Wrestling Championships. In November 2016, she won the gold medal at the 2016 Commonwealth Wrestling Championship in Singapore in the 48 kg category. 

In December 2016, she became the most expensive female wrestler at the Pro Wrestling League auction, bagging a 36 lakh INR contract with the Jaipur Ninjas franchise.

In November 2017, she won silver in the 48kg category in World U-23 Wrestling Championships being held in Bydgoscz, Poland. This is India's first silver in the championship.

Mixed martial arts career

ONE Championship
In February 2019, Phogat signed with ONE Championship with the intention of making her mixed martial arts debut. 

Phogat made her mixed martial arts debut against Nam Hee Kim at ONE Championship: Age Of Dragons in November 2019. She said, "In MMA my goal is to become the first Indian World champion."

Phogat faced Nou Srey Pov at ONE Championship: Inside the Matrix on 30 October 2020. She won the fight via TKO.

Just over a month removed from her last bout, Phogat faced Jomary Torres at ONE Championship: Big Bang on 4 December 2020. She won the fight via TKO due to elbows.

ONE Atomweight Grand Prix
Phogat faced Bi Nguyen at ONE Championship: Dangal on 15 May 2021 for a spot in the 2021 ONE Women's Atomweight Grand Prix. Phogat lost by split decision, suffering the first loss of her mixed martial arts career. 

Phogat was scheduled to face Meng Bo in a quarterfinal bout of the 2021 ONE Women's Atomweight Grand Prix  at ONE Championship: Empower on 28 May 2021. Instead, she faced Bi Nguyen in what was considered to be a warm-up bout. She lost the bout via a split decision. Due to the loss, Phogat was removed from the Grand Prix.

Phogat faced Lin Heqin at ONE Championship: Battleground on 30 July 2021. She won by unanimous decision. She has been added in the 2021 ONE Women's Atomweight Grand Prix after displaying dominant performance against Lin Heqin.

Phogat faced Meng Bo in a quarterfinal bout of the Atomweight World Grand-Prix at ONE Championship: Empower on September 3, 2021. After surviving an early onslaught in the first round, Phogat went on to dominate the final two rounds to win by unanimous decision and advance to the Grand Prix Semi Finals.

Phogat was scheduled to face Itsuki Hirata in the semi-final bout of ONE Women's Atomweight Grand Prix at ONE Championship: Next Generation on October 29, 2021. However due to sickness, Hirata had to pull out of the bout and was replaced by Jenelyn Olsim. Phogat won the fight by unanimous decision.

Phogat faced Stamp Fairtex in the ONE Women's Atomweight Grand Prix Final at ONE: Winter Warriors on December 3, 2021. She was defeated by submission via armbar in the second round.

Continued ONE career
Phogat faced former ONE Women's Strawweight title challenger Tiffany Teo at ONE 161 on September 29, 2022. She lost the fight via rear-naked choke submission in the first round.

On February 28, 2023, it was announced that Phogat had signed a three-year exclusive deal with Kumite 1 League.

Championships and accomplishments

Mixed martial arts
ONE Championship
2021 ONE Women's Atomweight World Grand Prix Runner-Up

Mixed martial arts record 

|-
|Loss
|align=center|7–3
|Tiffany Teo 
|Submission (rear-naked choke)
|ONE 161
|
|align=center|1
|align=center|4:52
|Kallang, Singapore 
|
|-
| Loss
|align=center| 7–2
| Stamp Fairtex
| Submission (armbar)
|ONE: Winter Warriors
|
|align=center|2
|align=center|2:14
|Kallang, Singapore
|
|-
| Win
| align=center| 7–1
| Jenelyn Olsim
| Decision (unanimous)
| ONE Championship: NextGen
| 
| align=center|3
| align=center|5:00
| Kallang, Singapore
| 
|-
| Win 
| align=center| 6–1
| Meng Bo 
| Decision (unanimous) 
| ONE Championship: Empower
| 
| align=center|3
| align=center|5:00
| Kallang, Singapore
| 
|-
| Win
| align=center| 5–1
| Lin Heqin
| Decision (unanimous)
| ONE Championship: Battleground
| 
| align=center|3
| align=center|5:00
| Kallang, Singapore
|
|-
| Loss
| align=center|4–1 
| Bi Nguyen
| Decision (split) 
| ONE Championship: Dangal
| 
| align=center|3
| align=center|5:00
| Kallang, Singapore
| 
|-
| Win
| align=center| 4–0
|  Jomary Torres
| TKO (elbows) 
| ONE Championship: Big Bang
| 
| align=center|1
| align=center|3:55 
| Kallang, Singapore
|
|-
| Win
| align=center| 3–0
|  Nou Srey Pov
| TKO (punches)
|ONE Championship: Inside the Matrix
| 
| align=center|2
| align=center|2:02
| Kallang, Singapore
|
|-
|Win
|align=center|2–0 
|Wu Chiao Chen
|Decision (unanimous) 
|ONE Championship: King of the Jungle
|
|align=center|3
|align=center|5:00 
|Kallang, Singapore  
|
|-
|Win
|align=center|1–0
|Nam Hee Kim 
|TKO (punches)
|ONE Championship: Age Of Dragons
|
|align=center|1
|align=center|3:37
|Beijing, China
|
|-

See also 

 List of female mixed martial artists

References

External links
 Profile at the United World Wrestling

Living people
1994 births
Indian female sport wrestlers
Indian female mixed martial artists
Mixed martial artists utilizing freestyle wrestling
Sportswomen from Haryana
People from Bhiwani district
Female sport wrestlers from Haryana
Ritu
Asian Wrestling Championships medalists
20th-century Indian women
21st-century Indian women